Alan Protheroe (10 January 1934 – 6 April 2013) was a BBC executive who served as assistant Director-General in the 1980s. In 1987, he went on to run the Services Sound and Vision Corporation, now BFBS, providing radio and television services to the British Armed Forces.

References

1934 births
2013 deaths
Welsh journalists
20th-century British businesspeople